Osgoode is a subway station on Line 1 Yonge–University in Toronto, Ontario, Canada. The station, which opened in 1963, is located under University Avenue where it is crossed by Queen Street West and is named for the nearby Osgoode Hall, which honours William Osgoode, the first chief justice of Upper Canada. Wi-Fi service is available at this station.

History and construction 

The station has an island platform and was constructed using the cut-and-cover method. There is a pocket track at the south end of the station which allows a southbound train to change direction.

When Osgoode was built, some utility lines were relocated away from the station to allow for a future "Lower Osgoode" station on the projected but never-built Queen Street subway, but unlike at Lower Queen, no actual construction took place. When it opened, Osgoode, like St. Andrew station, boasted Vitrolite tiles on its walls. Cracks resulting from the high water table at the station forced the TTC to cover over most of these tiles in the 1970s with vertical slats along the outer walls on the far side of the tracks and ceramic tiles on structural elements on the platform itself. In 2016, the slats on the outer walls were replaced by off-white panels, evoking the original design.

Entrances to the station were all built as open stairways from the sidewalk, with the panel above the lintel emblazoned with the scales of justice, which referenced the Superior Court of Justice at Osgoode Hall. Subsequent refurbishment resulted in a generic TTC style replacing the unique symbolism. In 2006, a new entrance, with elevator access to the concourse level, was integrated into the construction of the Four Seasons Centre, at the southeast corner of Queen and University. Along with an elevator to the platform level within the fare paid area, this made the station fully accessible as of 2007. Plans from 2008 call for Diamond and Schmitt Architects, who were responsible for the opera house, to design complementary covered entrances at the other three corners of the intersection.

Future 
Metrolinx plans to construct the Ontario Line, a rapid transit line connecting the south loop of Line 1 Yonge–University to the east wing of Line 2 Bloor–Danforth and north to Science Centre station, where the line will interchange with Line 5 Eglinton. The preferred route of the line is from Science Centre to Exhibition. Osgoode station is a planned station on this new line. The Ontario Line would be drilled out of rock at a lower level.

Nearby landmarks 
Nearby landmarks include the Four Seasons Centre for the Performing Arts, Toronto City Hall, Nathan Phillips Square, Osgoode Hall, the South African War Memorial, 299 Queen Street West, the Canada Life Building and the United States Consulate.

Surface connections 

A transfer is required to connect between the subway system and these surface routes:

TTC routes serving the station include:

References

External links 

 
 Lower Osgoode on Transit Toronto

Line 1 Yonge–University stations
Railway stations in Canada opened in 1963
1963 establishments in Ontario